The Men's road race B event at the 2012 Summer Paralympics took place on 8 September at Brands Hatch. Eighteen riders from fourteen different nations competed. The race distance was 104 km.

Results
DNF = Did Not Finish.
LAP = Lapped (8 km).

Source:

References

Men's road race B